The 1909 Tour de France was the 7th edition of Tour de France, one of cycling's Grand Tours. The Tour began in Paris on 5 July and Stage 7 occurred on 17 July with a flat stage to Nîmes. The race finished in Paris on 1 August.

Stage 1
5 July 1909 — Paris to Roubaix,

Stage 2
15 July 1909 — Roubaix to Metz,

Stage 3
9 July 1909 — Metz to Belfort,

Stage 4
11 July 1909 — Belfort to Lyon,

Stage 5
13 July 1909 — Lyon to Grenoble,

Stage 6
15 July 1909 — Grenoble to Nice,

Stage 7
17 July 1909 — Nice to Nîmes,

References

1909 Tour de France
Tour de France stages